Key management may refer to:
 Key management, in cryptography
 Key management (access control), the management of physical keys and access devices
 Key Management, Inc., part of Forcht Group of Kentucky